Olmos River (Río Olmos), is a river in the Lambayeque Region in northwestern Peru. It flows off the west slopes of the Andes and its tributaries, such as Los Boliches, carry little additional water. As a result, it is a low flow stream, intermittent in its lower reaches only flowing during the rainy season (mid November to mid April). Before it can reach the Pacific Ocean it disappears into the alluvium of the Sechura Desert.

The river starts in Huancabamba Province and flows south and west into Olmos District of Lambayeque Region. It passes just south of the town of Olmos, from which the river takes its name.

Olmos irrigation project
The Olmos irrigation project diverts  of water from the Tabacones River, a tributary of the Huancabamba River, at the Limón dam via a 24 km tunnel to the Olmos River.

Notes and references

Rivers of Peru